The President of the Republic of Crimea was the head of the then-styled Republic of Crimea, Ukraine from February 16, 1994, to the time of the liquidation of this position on March 17, 1995. The post was liquidated as it contradicted the Constitution of Ukraine.

The first round of voting in the Crimean presidential elections was held on January 16, 1994, and on January 30, the second round was held. With 72.9% of the vote, the pro-Russian politician Yuriy Meshkov was declared the winner. He was the only person to hold the post of President of the Republic of Crimea.

References

History of Crimea
Politics of Crimea
Titles held only by one person